Stewartstown Engine House, Stewartstown Railroad is a historic railroad engine house located at Stewartstown, York County, Pennsylvania.  It was built about 1884, and is a simple weatherboard building with a metal covered gable roof built by the Stewartstown Railroad.  It has two large bay doors on the front facade and a cement block addition.

It was added to the National Register of Historic Places in 1995.

References

Engine houses
Industrial buildings and structures on the National Register of Historic Places in Pennsylvania
Transport infrastructure completed in 1884
Transportation buildings and structures in York County, Pennsylvania
Railway depots on the National Register of Historic Places
National Register of Historic Places in York County, Pennsylvania
Railway buildings and structures on the National Register of Historic Places in Pennsylvania